Pieter Thomas van der Merwe  is an English writer on aspects of British maritime history, mainly from 1500 to 1914, but which have also included maritime archaeology and medieval shipbuilding. He also writes on the history of Greenwich, marine painting, stage scene-painting and maritime life in art, portraiture, literature and drama.  He is a graduate of the University of Manchester and the University of Bristol. He joined the staff of the National Maritime Museum in 1974 and was its General Editor until 2018.

He was appointed as a Deputy Lieutenant for Greater London in 2012 and represents the Crown in the Royal Borough of Greenwich

Works
 The Spectacular Career of Clarkson Stanfield (exh.cat. with R. Took: 1979)
 Historic Maritime Greenwich (1993)
 A Refuge for All: Greenwich Hospital, 1694-1994 (1994)
 Nelson, an Illustrated History (contr. and ed., 1995)
 E. Dekker, Globes at Greenwich... (ed., with K. Lippincott and M. Blyzinsky, 1999)
 South: the Race to the Pole (and ed., with contributions from D. Preston, R.E. Feeney, L. McKernan, 2000)
 Captain Cook in the Pacific (with N. Rigby and G. Williams, 2002)
 Science and the French and British Navies, 1700-1850 (ed., 2003)
 Pioneers of the Pacific: Voyages of Exploration, 1787-1810 (with N. Rigby and G. Williams, 2005)
 The Queen's House, Greenwich [an illustrated history] (2012)

References

Living people
English naval historians
Dutch naval historians
Alumni of the University of Bristol
Alumni of the University of Manchester
Deputy Lieutenants of Greater London
Members of the Order of the British Empire
Year of birth missing (living people)